The 1991 Taraba State gubernatorial election occurred on December 14, 1991. SDP candidate Jolly Nyame won the election, defeating NRC candidate.

Conduct
The gubernatorial election was conducted using an open ballot system. Primaries for the two parties to select their flag bearers were conducted on October 19, 1991.

The election occurred on December 14, 1991. SDP candidate Jolly Nyame won the election, defeating NRC candidate. Jolly Nyame polled 484,090 votes.

References 

Gubernatorial election 1991
Tar
December 1991 events in Nigeria